Elections to Wolverhampton City Council were held on 3 May 2007 in Wolverhampton, England. One third of the council was up for election and the Labour Party kept overall control of the council.

Composition

Prior to the election, the composition of the council was:

Labour Party 40
Conservative Party 15
Liberal Democrat 2
Liberal 1
Independent 2

After the election, the composition of the council was:

Labour Party 36
Conservative Party 19
Liberal Democrat 3 
Liberal 1
Independent 1

Election result

Ward results

Number of candidates

Of the main political parties, both the Conservative Party and Labour Party fielded a full slate of 20 candidates each.

The Liberal Democrats fielded 18 candidates, failing to have a candidate in place in both Wednesfield North and Heath Town wards.

One independent candidate stood in each of the following 6 wards:

Bilston East
East Park
Heath Town
Park
Spring Vale
Wednesfield North

The British National Party fielded 6 candidates, one candidate in each of the following wards:

Bushbury North
Bushbury South & Low Hill
Fallings Park
Tettenhall Wightwick
Wednesfield North
Wednesfield South

The Green Party had a candidate in each of the following 3 wards:

Bilston North
Park
St Peter's

The Liberal Party stood in only one ward, Heath Town.

External links
2007 Wolverhampton election result from BBC
Elections results from council webpage

2007
2000s in the West Midlands (county)
Wolverhampton City Council